The Montenegrin Amateur Radio Pool (MARP) (in Montenegrin, Mreža za Afirmaciju Radioamaterskog Pokreta) is a national non-profit organization for amateur radio enthusiasts in Montenegro.

MARP represents the interests of Montenegrin amateur radio operators before international telecommunications regulatory authorities. MARP is the national member society representing Montenegro in the International Amateur Radio Union.

13th World HST Championship 
Between 21st and 25 September 2016, MARP was leading organizer of 13th IARU World HST Championship held in Herceg-Novi, Montenegro

HST Championship gathered 148 competitors from 25 different countries and 3 different continents.

See also
Amateur radio
High-speed telegraphy
International Amateur Radio Union

References 

International Amateur Radio Union member societies